Pleased to Meet You is the third studio album by English Britpop band Sleeper. The album was released on 13 October 1997 in the UK, peaking at #7 on the UK Album Chart. Two singles were released from this album, "She's a Good Girl", which reached #28, and "Romeo Me", which scraped in at #39 on the UK Top 40 singles chart. Remixes of "Motorway Man" by producer Steve Osbourne were released on 12" vinyl.

In a review for AllMusic, Stephen Thomas Erlewine stated that Pleased to Meet You "demonstrates that [Louise] Wener's songwriting has strengthened, as her melodies have more weight and her lyrics have more depth," and gave the record a three-star review. It was recorded in summer 1997 in London.

Track listing
Credits per booklet.

Personnel
Personnel per booklet.

Sleeper
 Louise Wener – vocals, guitar
 Andy Maclure – drums, percussion, guitar, keyboard, string arranger (track 11)
 Jon Stewart – guitar

Additional musicians
 Chris Giammalvo – electric bass, double bass
 John Green – keyboards, string arrangement
 Stephen Street – programming
 John Metcalf – string arranger (track 10)
 The Duke String Quartet – strings
 The Kick Horns – brass (track 2)

Production and design
 Stephen Street – producer, mixing
 Cenzo Townsend – producer (track 12), mixing, engineer
 Sleeper – producer (track 12)
 John Smith – engineer
 Gerrard Navarro – assistant engineer
 Tom Girling – assistant engineer
 Andy Green – assistant engineer

References

External links
Sleeper Greatest Hits music videos on YouTube

1997 albums
Sleeper (band) albums
Albums produced by Stephen Street